Deane Bozeman School, originally Bozeman Learning Center, is located at 13410 Hwy 77 in Bay County, Florida. The school sits on a 33-acre campus approximately 12 miles north of Lynn Haven in northwest Bay County. It is a part of Bay District Schools.

It serves PreK-12th grade and opened in August, 2000 as a PreK-8th grade school with 750 students. As of 2014 it served 1,300 students. The school's teams compete as the Bucks. The school is named for Deane Bozeman, a long serving Bay County School Board member and volunteer.

The school campus includes two elementary classroom buildings; two middle school classroom buildings; two high school classroom buildings; band, chorus and art facilities; a media center; cafeteria that doubles as a stage; administrative building; and covered elementary physical education pavilion. An art science classroom building and baseball field opened in 2007. The school also has a softball field, tennis courts, track and field area, and a football stadium on campus that is shared with other county schools.

References

Schools in Bay County, Florida
High schools in Bay County, Florida
Public K-12 schools in Florida